The Shiyan–Tianshui Expressway, designated as G7011 and commonly referred to as the Shitian Expressway is an expressway that connects Shiyan, Hubei, China and Tianshui, Gansu. It is a spur of G70 Fuzhou–Yinchuan Expressway.

Overview

Hubei Province

Shaanxi Province

Gansu Province
The section opened on October 1 2015.

Route table

References

Chinese national-level expressways
Expressways in Hubei
Expressways in Shaanxi
Expressways in Gansu